Monopoly Millionaires' Club (MMC) was a series of 16 scratchcard games that differed by its participating lotteries; its players could become eligible to be flown to Las Vegas to take part in an episode of the Monopoly Millionaires′ Club game show (see below) 

It was initially a U.S. multistate lottery drawing game coordinated by the Multi-State Lottery Association (MUSL), using the Monopoly board game brand under license from Hasbro. 

Each $5 ticket for the draw game contained five numbers from 1 through 52, and a randomly generated sixth number from 1 through 28 that represented a property from the Monopoly board game. (Multiple plays from one bet slip were printed on separate tickets.) The jackpot began at $15 million (annuity value) and was capped at $25 million; if the jackpot was won, additional prizes of $1 million (each paid in lump sum) would be awarded. Tickets also contained a code to "collect" the corresponding property on the MMC website; collecting specific sets of properties made a player eligible for a chance to appear as a contestant (or an audience member) on the Monopoly Millionaires' Club game show, in which contestants could compete to win up to $1 million.

Ticket sales for the draw game began on October 19, 2014 in 22 states and the District of Columbia, with the first drawing held on October 24. In December, after the Texas Lottery pulled out of the game, the remaining participants voted to suspend Monopoly Millionaires' Club after the December 26 draw. The draw game was plagued by low ticket sales, along with concerns that the game was, with its multiple components, too complicated for players to understand.

The Monopoly Millionaires' Club game show was unaffected by the suspension of the draw game; it premiered in syndication on March 28, 2015; that month, it was announced that the MMC lottery game would be revived as a series of scratchcard games (prizes varied by lottery jurisdiction); 16 lotteries offered a scratch-off game with the same $5 price point as the draw game. (The game show's first season featured hour-long episodes; the second season's shows were 30 minutes each. The final episode was shown on April 30, 2016.)

Former draw game
Monopoly Millionaires' Club drawings occurred on Friday nights; each play cost $5, with multiple plays printed on separate tickets. To win the jackpot, players must have matched 5 of 52 numbers in the main field (selected manually or through a quick pick), and a sixth number (automatic quick-pick) from a second field of 28; the latter was represented on the ticket by a property from a U.S. edition Monopoly game board (22 streets, 4 railroads, and 2 utilities), such as Marvin Gardens for the number 22. Jackpots started at $15 million, and were to be capped at $25 million until won.

In addition to the five regular numbers plus the property, each ticket contained a 12-digit "Millionaires' Club Number"; in the event that the jackpot was won, additional $1 million raffle-style prizes were drawn from the Millionaires' Club numbers. A minimum of 10 were to be drawn for a $15 million jackpot; at least two were added per "rollover", so that a capped $25 million jackpot would have at least 16 additional cash millionaires if that jackpot was hit. An MMC jackpot winner also received a custom top hat, resembling that worn by Mr. Monopoly. Tickets also contained a 25-character alphanumeric code that could be used to add the ticket's property to a virtual game board on the Monopoly Millionaires' Club website. Collecting certain sets of properties, such as Boardwalk and Park Place, awarded players a varying number of entries towards a chance to attend a taping of the Monopoly Millionaires' Club game show.

Draw game prizes and odds

† Drawn only if jackpot was won. Ten "Club" numbers were to be drawn if a $15 million jackpot was won; a minimum of 16 were to be chosen with a $25 million (capped) jackpot.

Overall odds of winning any prize were approximately 1 in 10. The only jackpot win occurred during its third drawing (November 7, 2014), in which a player from New Jersey won $21 million. The first $25 million MMC jackpot drawing was the game's seventh, on December 5.

Draw game participants
Twenty-two states and the District of Columbia participated in the launch of Monopoly Millionaires′ Club; nine states were to join the draw game in 2015.

 Arizona
 Arkansas
 District of Columbia
 Florida
 Georgia
 Indiana
 Iowa
 Kentucky
 Maine
 Maryland
 Michigan
 Minnesota
 Missouri
 New Hampshire 
 New Jersey
 New Mexico
 New York
 North Carolina
 Pennsylvania
 Rhode Island
 South Dakota
 Tennessee
 Texas (suspended sales following the December 12, 2014 drawing)

Were to join draw game in 2015
 California
 Idaho
 Kansas
 North Dakota°
 Ohio
 Vermont
 Virginia
 West Virginia (January 10)
 Wisconsin

°North Dakota state law prohibits one-state games and scratch tickets; as such, North Dakota was eligible to join the draw game, but was prohibited from offering the MMC scratchcard.

Suspension of draw game
On December 11, 2014, the Texas Lottery announced that it would suspend its participation in Monopoly Millionaires' Club after the December 12 draw. Also on December 12, the remaining MMC members followed suit, voting to suspend the game following its December 26 draw; only 10 drawings were held in total. The suspension came in response to low ticket sales for the game: critics felt that the $5 tickets were too expensive, and prior to the first MMC drawing, a writer for The Philadelphia Inquirer expressed concerns that the game was too confusing, citing the "Club" bonus prize system and the property collection for game show entries. Sales of tickets were strongest per capita in Pennsylvania. It was not known then whether the game would be revived in a revised form.

On March 10, 2015, MUSL announced that the MMC lottery game would be revived for a series of scratch-and-win games, where players could, as with the failed draw game, win the opportunity to participate in a Monopoly Millionaires' Club game show taping.

MMC game show
The Monopoly Millionaires' Club game show, hosted by Billy Gardell, premiered in weekly syndication on the weekend of March 28–29, 2015. As of October 2014, it had been sold to stations in the 44 states and the District of Columbia (including non-MMC states) where lottery tickets are sold.

Season 1 shows were taped at Rio All Suite Hotel and Casino in Las Vegas; each episode featured five contestants playing Monopoly-inspired games to win up to $100,000 each, and the possibility to risk their winnings for a chance to win $1 million cash; the money won by the contestant (but not other prizes) were split, with half of the cash going to that player's section of the audience (The $1 million top prize is not shared by that player's section; instead, it shares an "Audience Jackpot" cash prize.) Production of the series continued through the suspension of the draw game, with later tapings utilizing players qualifying from the various versions of the MMC scratchcard.

Season 2 tapings were moved to Bally's Events Center, in Bally's Las Vegas hotel, with the shows reduced to 30-minute episodes, with the number of qualifying games reduced to three; two of the audience sections were removed, but later reappeared.

The final MMC episode was shown on April 30, 2016. Only 4 contestants have won the $1 million grand prize and joined the Monopoly Millionaire's Club during the lifespan of the show.

References

External links
 PlayMMC.com

Lottery games in the United States
Monopoly (game)